James Desmond Ridder (born August 31, 1999) is an American football quarterback for the Atlanta Falcons of the National Football League (NFL). He played college football at Cincinnati, where he was twice-named AAC Offensive Player of the Year before being selected by the Atlanta Falcons in the third round of the 2022 NFL Draft.

Early life and high school career
Ridder was born in Louisville, Kentucky, to a 15-year-old mother and was raised by his mother and grandmother. He attended Holy Family Parochial before attending St. Xavier High School.

As a senior at St. Xavier, Ridder passed for 1,319 yards and nine touchdowns and also led the Tigers in rushing with 668 yards and 12 touchdowns and was named All-Metro. He was rated as a two-star recruit by Rivals.com and a three-star recruit by 24/7 Sports and committed to play college football at the University of Cincinnati over an offer from Eastern Kentucky. He received his scholarship offer from Cincinnati head coach Tommy Tuberville following a tryout held on the morning of the Kentucky Oaks for offensive coordinator Zac Taylor during his junior year. After Tuberville resigned during his senior year, new coach Luke Fickell honored the offer and Ridder signed his National Letter of Intent.

College career
Ridder redshirted his true freshman season. He became the Bearcats' starting quarterback as a redshirt freshman and passed for 2,445 yards and 20 touchdowns and gained 583 yards rushing along with five touchdowns and was named the American Athletic Conference (AAC) Rookie of the Year. 

As a redshirt sophomore, Ridder completed 179 of 325 passes for 2,164 yards and 18 touchdowns against nine interceptions while also rushing for 650 yards and five touchdowns. He was named the MVP of the 2020 Birmingham Bowl completing 14-of-24 passes for 95 yards and one touchdown, while also rushing for 105 yards and three touchdowns in a 38-6 victory over Boston College.

The 2020 season would prove to be a breakout campaign for the junior QB. Ridder was named the Walter Camp Offensive Player of the Week and the Davey O'Brien National Quarterback of the Week after completing 13-of-21 passes for 126 yards and a touchdown and also rushing eight times for 179 yards and three touchdowns in a 42-13 win over 16th-ranked SMU on October 24, 2020. At the conclusion of the regular season, Ridder was named the AAC Offensive Player of the Year after passing 2,296 yards, and 19 touchdowns with six interceptions, while also rushing for 592 yards and 12 touchdowns, in only nine games due to the COVID-19-shortened season. Ridder considered declaring for the 2021 NFL Draft, but opted to return for his redshirt senior season.

For the second time in his career, Ridder was named the Davey O'Brien National Quarterback of the Week after the No. 7 Bearcats defeated No. 9 Notre Dame on the road. Ridder went 19-of-32 for 297 yards and two TDs. In addition, he rushed for 26 yards and a game-sealing fourth quarter touchdown as the Bearcats snapped the Fighting Irish’s 26-game home winning streak. Following an unbeaten 12-0 season, Ridder and the Bearcats went into the 2021 American Athletic Conference Football Championship Game ranked number four in the AP Polls, meaning a victory would see them stay in a playoff spot. Following a 35-20 win over the Houston Cougars, they became the first Group of Five team to make the playoffs, as well as the last major undefeated team going into the post-season. Ridder and Cincinnati would fall 27-6 to the Alabama Crimson Tide in the college football playoff semi-finals, finishing his final year in college with 30 passing touchdowns, six rushing touchdowns, and just eight interceptions, in what was the best season in the program's history.

Statistics

Professional career

After an impressive collegiate career at the University of Cincinnati, Desmond Ridder was invited to the NFL Scouting Combine along with other top quarterback prospects.  At the combine, he measured in at 6'3" and 211 lbs., with a 32.75-inch arm span and a 10-inch hand span.  With a 4.52-second 40-yard dash, Ridder posted one of the fastest times recorded by a quarterback.  At the end of the pre-draft process, most experts projected Ridder as a first-round to third-round pick.  He was rated as the fourth-best quarterback prospect in the 2022 NFL Draft, after Malik Willis, Kenny Pickett, & Matt Corral. 

Ridder was drafted in the third round (74th overall) of the 2022 NFL Draft by the Atlanta Falcons. Ridder was considered a surprise fall in the draft, as many analysts had projected him to be drafted as high as the eighth overall pick. He was just the second quarterback to be selected in the draft, after Kenny Pickett was selected in the first round by the Pittsburgh Steelers.

2022 season: Rookie year

Heading into his first training camp in the NFL, Desmond Ridder competed for the starting quarterback job against veteran Marcus Mariota.  On July 28, 2022, head coach Arthur Smith named Mariota as the starting quarterback to open the season, with Ridder serving as the backup.  

On December 8, 2022, the Falcons benched Mariota and named Ridder as the starting quarterback for the rest of the season.

Ridder made his NFL debut in Week 15 against the New Orleans Saints, where he was 13-of-26 for 97 yards, zero touchdowns, zero interceptions, and 38 rushing yards in the 18–21 loss. In Week 17 against the Arizona Cardinals, Ridder was 19-of-26 for 169 yards in the 20–19 victory, his first career NFL win. In Week 18 against the Tampa Bay Buccaneers, Ridder was 19-for-30 for 224 yards and two touchdowns in the 30–17 win.

Ridder finished his rookie season with 708 passing yards, two touchdowns, zero interceptions, an 86.4 passer rating, and 64 rushing yards.

NFL career statistics

Regular season

References

External links
Atlanta Falcons bio
Cincinnati Bearcats bio

1999 births
Living people
Players of American football from Louisville, Kentucky
American football quarterbacks
Cincinnati Bearcats football players
St. Xavier High School (Louisville) alumni
Atlanta Falcons players